Campegine is a comune (municipality) in the Province of Reggio Emilia in the Italian region Emilia-Romagna, located about  northwest of Bologna and about  northwest of Reggio Emilia.

Campegine borders the following municipalities: Cadelbosco di Sopra, Castelnovo di Sotto, Gattatico, Reggio Emilia, 
Sant'Ilario d'Enza.

The Cervi Brothers were born in Campegine.

Twin towns
 Montry, France, since 1979 to 1996

References

External links
 Official website

Cities and towns in Emilia-Romagna